"Denim and Lace" is a song by Australian pop singer Marty Rhone. It was released in July 1975 as the lead single from his debut studio album, of the same name. It is co-written by Laurence Lister and Francis Lyons, who also produced it for EMI Music. "Denim and Lace" peaked at number eight on the Australian Kent Music Report singles chart.

Background 

Marty Rhone, an Australian-based pop singer, signed with M7 Records a sub-label of EMI Music in mid-1975. Rhone had spent the previous year or two as an actor – both in music theatre and TV dramas. "Denim and Lace" was used to re-launch his singing career. It was co-written by Laurence "Roy" Lister and Francis "Shad" Lyons. Lister was an A&R agent for Leeds Music while Lyons was a country music artist. Both also produced the single.

Reception

Cash Box magazine said "Marty Rhone sets an aggressive vocal against a choppy strut beat, sounding a bit like the Everly Brothers at times and Neil Sedaka at other points. A very simple story, equally simple catchy melody line, clean production and a good, high echoing hook combine for almost assured AM airplay."

Track listing

7" single (MS-115)
Side A "Denim and Lace" (Laurence Lister, Francis Lyons) - 5:19
Side B "Take Me" - 3:36

Charts

Year-end charts

References

1975 singles
1975 songs
EMI Records singles